WIAT (channel 42) is a television station in Birmingham, Alabama, United States, affiliated with CBS and owned by Nexstar Media Group. The station's studios are located on Golden Crest Drive atop Red Mountain, next to the American General candelabra tower it shares with several central Alabama broadcast outlets (near the southern edge of Birmingham).

History

Early history of UHF channel 42 in Birmingham
The history of the UHF channel 42 allocation in the Birmingham market traces back to 1949, when the Birmingham News Company, owners of The Birmingham News and Birmingham Age-Herald newspapers, applied for a construction permit with the Federal Communications Commission (FCC) for a television station license under the call letters WSGN-TV (for the "South's Greatest Newspaper"), which would have served as a sister station to radio station WSGN (610 AM, now WAGG; and 93.7 FM, now WDJC), owned by the News Southern Broadcasting subsidiary. The station partnered with The Voice of Alabama, Inc., owners of WAFM-TV (channel 13, later WABT and WAPI-TV, and now WVTM-TV), to construct a broadcast tower next to its newly completed studio facility on Red Mountain, adjacent to Vulcan Park; plans called for WSGN-TV to operate from the radio stations' Radio Park building.

The application, however, faced multiple delays on its approval. The first such moratorium on the license approval resulted from a freeze on broadcast licenses that imposed by the FCC the previous summer; however Bascom Hopson, president and general manager of WSGN radio, requested an extension to the agency's consideration of the license. At one point, Southern tried to forge a deal with the owners of WCBI-TV in Columbus, Mississippi to forfeit its VHF channel 4 assignment in order to allow the allocation to be reassigned to Birmingham for use by the proposed station (the FCC reassigned the channel 4 frequency to Columbus in 1953, when WBRC-TV moved to channel 6 to alleviate signal interference issues with WSM-TV [now WSMV-TV] in Nashville). In 1954, months after the News decided to purchase WAFM-TV, Johnston Broadcasting – then-owners of radio stations WJLD (1400 AM) and WJLN-FM (104.7, now WZZK) – applied to launch a television station on UHF channel 48; after Southern Broadcasting's effort to acquire the channel 4 frequency failed, it sold the permit to Johnston in order for that group to operate its planned television station on the channel 42 frequency.

As WBMG
In 1956, Southern Broadcasting renewed its efforts to build a third commercial television station in Birmingham, when it formed a partnership with Chicago film salesman-turned-investment banker Bill DuBois to file for a new construction permit. Although the new permit application was granted that year, the station's debut was delayed due to a shortage of broadcast transmission equipment following the Korean War and while the station unsuccessfully applied to have channel 4 moved to Birmingham. The station would not sign on the air until October 17, 1965, as WBMG (standing for Birmingham); the first program to air on channel 42 when it debuted at 5:30 p.m. that evening was NBC's broadcast of The Capitol: Chronicle of Freedom. It was owned by Birmingham Television Corporation, a consortium between DuBois and Southern Broadcasting in which DuBois held controlling interest. Many members of channel 42's early staff consisted of on-air personalities and other employees from WSGN radio, including Bill Bolen (who would later move to WBRC-TV), who served as one of WBMG's initial news anchors.

As was the case at the time with most UHF television stations in markets served by at least two commercial VHF stations – in Birmingham's case, NBC affiliate WAPI-TV; and then-ABC affiliate WBRC-TV – WBMG experienced considerable competitive disadvantages from the outset that would plague the station for over 30 years. At the time of its sign-on, many households in the market did not have television sets capable of tuning into UHF broadcast signals without the aid of a converter. Television set manufacturers had only begun including UHF tuners built into the sets one year earlier, per a 1962 directive from the FCC. Even with a converter, the picture quality from UHF stations was marginal at best.

The station's signal also left much to be desired. The Birmingham market is a fairly large market geographically, stretching across nearly the entire width of the state from near the Mississippi state line eastward to the Georgia state line. Much of the terrain within this area is also hilly to mountainous, particularly in the eastern part of the state, which lies within the foothills of the Appalachian Mountains. This was a major reason as to why it took longer for Birmingham to get a third television station in comparison to other cities of its size; on paper, the market's population had been large enough to support three full network affiliates since the 1950s. The FCC had actually allocated four VHF channels to what would become the Birmingham market. However, two of them, channels 7 and 10 were acquired by Alabama Educational Television (now Alabama Public Television) for its two original charter stations, WBIQ in Birmingham and WCIQ in Mount Cheaha. Both had signed on in 1955 and were donated to the Alabama Educational Television Commission by Storer Broadcasting – which owned WBRC from 1953 to 1957 – both due to the company's support of educational broadcasting and as an attempt to stave off additional commercial competition.  At the time, most UHF signals did not travel nearly as far as their VHF counterparts, resulting in inadequate coverage, especially in rugged terrain.  As a result, channel 42's coverage area was effectively limited to Birmingham itself and some inner-ring suburbs over Red Mountain.

The station originally broadcast for four hours each evening, carrying a mix of prime time programming from both CBS and NBC, before expanding its broadcast day from 7:00 a.m. to 12:00 a.m. two weeks later on November 1, 1965. On paper, WBMG took the CBS affiliation from WAPI-TV. However, CBS continued to allow channel 13 to air some of its more popular programs, in part due to the aforementioned signal shortfalls with channel 42. WBMG was thus left with CBS' news programming and numerous lower-rated CBS shows. To help fill out its schedule, it also aired some NBC programs that WAPI-TV didn't carry. Among these programs was, strangely given its popularity elsewhere in the country, The Tonight Show, which WAPI would not clear until 1969 (albeit on a one-hour tape delay); as well as the infamous Heidi Game event between the American Football League's Oakland Raiders and New York Jets in November 1968.

One benefit, though, was that WBMG cleared the CBS Evening News, which began airing in Birmingham for the first time in over two years. After CBS and NBC expanded their evening news programs to 30 minutes in 1963, NBC's The Huntley-Brinkley Report, which was carried by WAPI-TV, was the only national network newscast seen in Birmingham until channel 42 signed on (WBRC did not carry ABC's national newscast, John Daly and the News and its successors until September 1963). WBMG also carried certain locally produced and syndicated programs that aired on channel 13 (such as the University of Alabama football coaches' program, The Bear Bryant Show), which were rebroadcast on channel 42 in different time slots. Both WBMG and WAPI listed their affiliation as "CBS/NBC". One advantage that WBMG had over its rivals was that it was the first television station to be equipped for color broadcasts; at the time the station signed on, it had acquired a color film chain, specialized projection equipment that allowed it to air films and slides in color, although most of the station's cameras consisted of monochrome equipment previously used by WBRC (which channel 42's original chief engineer worked for before being hired by WBMG). By 1970, though, WAPI's owners, the Newhouse family, opted to sign an exclusive affiliation contract with NBC, leaving WBMG to take a full-time CBS affiliation more or less by default; both stations became exclusive affiliates of the respective networks on May 31 of that year.

With a poor signal, the lack of television sets with UHF tuning capability and two of the South's oldest and most respected stations as its competitors, WBMG found the going very difficult. Due in part to WBMG's weak signal, CBS opted to affiliate with two other central Alabama stations, WCFT-TV (channel 33, now Heroes & Icons affiliate WSES) in Tuscaloosa and WHMA-TV (channel 40, later WJSU-TV and now Heroes & Icons affiliate WGWW) in Anniston. WCFT signed on ten days after WBMG made its debut (WHMA would not sign on until October 1969), and the signals of both the Tuscaloosa and Anniston stations reached some households in Birmingham proper that had UHF rooftop antennas installed (WCFT and WHMA carried an identical selection of prime time programming from CBS and NBC as WBMG did when all three stations were dual affiliates of the two networks). Furthermore, CBS' decision to cancel many of its rural-oriented sitcoms and variety shows in 1971 – especially the country music showcase Hee Haw, and shows hosted by Sylacauga native Jim Nabors – in order to comply with the Prime Time Access Rule, was a probable cause in hampering WBMG's ability to attract viewers in rural Alabama, where those programs were highly popular among viewers. For example, when Hee Haw returned as a syndicated program in the fall of 1971, it aired on WAPI because that station's longevity and larger audience made it more attractive to the show's producer, Youngestreet Productions. However, many of WBMG's problems were of its own making. For instance, its newscasts were widely perceived as unprofessional.

Still, WBMG gained publicity in Central Alabama for some locally produced shows, such as live studio wrestling, and the children's program Sergeant Jack (which aired weekdays on the station from November 1965 to September 1976, before being relegated to weekends from that point until June 1982), hosted by former WSGN disc jockey Neal Miller, who donned a sheriff's deputy uniform for the character (which was named by Jack Caddell, founder of Homewood-based fast food chain Jack's Hamburgers, which sponsored the show); Miller would be sworn in by then-Jefferson County Sheriff Mel Bailey (with whom Caddell collaborated with in developing the Sergeant Jack character) as an honorary deputy, as a prerequisite to be allowed to wear the official Jefferson County Sheriff's uniform on-air and in promotional appearances. The program revolved around Dick Tracy and Mr. Magoo cartoon shorts, and incorporated wraparound segments in which Miller interacted with various puppet characters; typical for children's programs of its day, it also featured a studio audience made up of elementary school-aged children (by the time the program ended, the audience had been dropped, with Miller simply sitting in front of a curtain and providing introductions to the cartoons). The station also assumed the local rights to the Romper Room preschool program franchise from WAPI-TV in June 1970; the second host of the Birmingham version, former teacher Carol Aldy, remained with the program after its move to channel 42, before she was replaced that September by Rita Sparling, who hosted the show until it ended in June 1971. Mother Angelica – who, in 1981, would launch a Christian-oriented cable network based in Irondale, the Eternal Word Television Network (EWTN) – began her career by taping faith-related programs at the WBMG studios for distribution on the station and other broadcast outlets.

DuBois and Southern Broadcasting tried vigorously to increase channel 42's signal coverage area and the quality of its local programming production, first by constructing a transmission tower that operated at 1.2 million watts in 1969. Next, they built a larger studio facility for the station on Golden Crest Drive, atop Red Mountain, where the studios of WBRC and WAPI were also located. However, this did not significantly improve the station's situation, likely prompting DuBois and Southern to sell WBMG to Park Communications for $5.5 million in 1973, becoming its tenth station and bringing that company to the FCC's national television station ownership limit at the time. Park significantly boosted the station's signal, erecting yet another new tower in 1974. Even still, WBMG's signal remained rather weak after the signal boost, effectively limiting its coverage area to Birmingham itself, Jefferson County, and close-in suburbs in Chilton and Shelby counties. This came back to haunt the station when cable arrived in Birmingham later in the 1970s. While this should have eliminated the disadvantage of being a UHF station serving such a large market, many cable providers in the western and eastern portions of the market refused to pick up channel 42 because its signal in those areas was weak to the point of unacceptability. With this in mind, CBS retained affiliations with WCFT and WHMA/WJSU, which regularly trounced WBMG in the ratings for their respective regions. This was especially true in Anniston since WBMG's signal did not cover east-central portions of Alabama well at all during that period, because of the higher elevations of the Appalachian foothills. What little market share WBMG had accrued in those areas dwindled even further when Arbitron separated Tuscaloosa and Anniston into separate markets (despite the fact that WCFT, WJSU and WCIQ were the only television stations in either market, which were otherwise served by the three VHF stations out of Birmingham) in 1977.

Even when local news programming returned to the station in 1987 after a seven-year hiatus, WBMG had no luck whatsoever competing with WVTM-TV and WBRC in news or sign-on to sign-off viewership, leading many industry insiders to deem Birmingham a de facto two-station market. Channel 42 was perennially one of CBS' weakest affiliates, in marked contrast to its competitors, which were two of their networks' strongest affiliates. It even trailed WTTO (channel 21, now a CW affiliate), an independent station, and later a Fox affiliate, that had only been on the air since April 1982. By some measures, it was the weakest major-network affiliate in the nation. The station's performance was so weak that, by the early 1990s, WBMG was only ahead of another independent station, WABM (channel 68, now a MyNetworkTV affiliate), in the Birmingham ratings. In many cases, A. C. Nielsen couldn't even rate CBS' programs in Birmingham, since the sample sizes were too small to generate a rating.

To absolve ownership conflicts caused by its near-concurrent purchases of WVTM and WBRC, New World Communications decided to establish an outside trust company that it would place WBRC into, with the intent to sell the station to Fox's television station subsidiary, Fox Television Stations, on October 12, 1994; Fox, in turn, planned to convert WBRC into an owned-and-operated station of the network (New World had signed an affiliation agreement with Fox in May 1994, to switch most of the television stations it already owned or was in the process of acquiring from Argyle Communications and Citicasters to the network, but exempted WVTM from the agreement due to its sale of WBRC to Fox); however, ABC's affiliation with that station did not expire until August 31, 1996, forcing Fox to continue to run WBRC as an ABC affiliate, while that network sought another station to become its new affiliate for central Alabama.

ABC initially approached WTTO, which was about to lose its Fox affiliation to WBRC. However, WTTO was not willing to build a news department; at the time, its owner, Sinclair Broadcast Group, did not budget for local news programming on its non-Big Three stations. It was only willing to carry ABC's prime time and sports programming. Knowing that it was about to be displaced from a station that had dominated the ratings for over 30 years, ABC wanted to affiliate with a station that at least had a functioning news department. With this in mind, ABC approached WBMG for a deal. Despite channel 42's anemic ratings, ABC saw enough promise that it even offered to buy WBMG outright; instead, for undisclosed reasons, Park Communications signed a long-term affiliation deal with CBS.

In January 1996, ABC signed an affiliation agreement with Allbritton Communications for its newly acquired stations, WCFT-TV and WJSU-TV (the latter of which Allbritton had agreed to operate under a local marketing agreement with then-owner Osborne Communications Corporation weeks prior), which developed a unique arrangement in which both would combine their operations to act as full-powered satellites of low-power station W58CK (channel 58, now WBMA-LD), whose signal did not extend outside of Jefferson and Shelby counties. The arrangement was made because WCFT and WJSU would not be counted in Nielsen ratings reports for Birmingham, since Tuscaloosa and Anniston were separate markets, which would have prevented ABC programming in the market from being counted toward the network's national viewership counts. At that time the switch took place on September 1, 1996, CBS decided to affiliate with another central Alabama station, WNAL-TV (channel 44, now Ion Television O&O WPXH-TV) in Gadsden, a former Fox affiliate and one-time repeater of WTTO's Tuscaloosa satellite WDBB (channel 17), which had decent coverage of the eastern portions of the Birmingham area as well as eastern Alabama.

Sale to Media General and callsign change to WIAT

In 1997, Park Communications was sold to Richmond, Virginia-based Media General. However, the new ownership brought no change to the station's flagging ratings. By late 1997, WBMG's market share had dropped to a mere 1%, leaving it significantly behind not only WBRC, WVTM and WBMA-LP, but also WTTO and even behind WABM at times (the latter two stations did not air any news programming at the time). Per an agreement with CBS, which had become increasingly concerned about its lackluster performance in a fast-growing market, Media General invested millions of dollars into turning WBMG's fortunes around.

As a first step, Media General boosted WBMG's overall transmitting power to 5 million watts, the highest level allowed by the FCC for a VHF station. This finally gave the station a coverage area comparable to those of WBRC and WVTM. The upgrades made by Media General also allowed channel 42 to become the first television station in the market to broadcast a digital television signal, and effectively, the first to broadcast network programming in high definition, an accomplishment that was important to Media General as it fought the wide perception among viewers and those in the media industry that the station had a weak signal.

In order to signify a new start as channel 42 prepared to reboot its news department (see below), Media General also applied to change the station's callsign to WIAT (for "It's About Time", the station's new slogan) on February 1, 1998. One month earlier, Eric Land, whom the group hired as the station's general manager, fired all but one member of its news department staff and replaced channel 42's evening newscasts with a countdown clock to signal the forthcoming relaunch of the station as WIAT on February 5 (the WBMG call letters are now used by a low-power station on UHF channel 38 in Moody).

On that date, preceding the debut of its relaunched 5:00 p.m. newscast under the new 42 Daily News format, Land appeared in the parking lot outside the station's studios just before the countdown clock expired speaking to an unseen audience of Birmingham-area community leaders on the meaning behind the station's relaunch, before throwing a switch that blew up an image of the logo WBMG had been using since the fall of 1995 to unveil the new WIAT logo. Further allowing WIAT to be able to gain some footing in other parts of central Alabama, Paxson Communications (now Ion Media Networks) chose not to renew WPXH's contract with CBS and cede the network's rights in central Alabama to WIAT in January 1999, in preparation of turning channel 44 into the Pax TV (now Ion Television) owned-and-operated outlet for all of Central Alabama.

In 2003, Bill Ballard, who took over as WIAT's president and general manager, forged a new path for the station which included numerous changes to its newscasts and programming including the acquisition of a stronger slate of syndicated programs (such as Dr. Phil, Jeopardy! and Entertainment Tonight) and a much more aggressive approach to its news coverage. The moves which were implemented dramatically altered the landscape of Central Alabama television, and allowed channel 42 to become a factor in the local ratings for the first time in the station's history. At that time, WIAT discontinued all references to its callsign and erstwhile slogan, "It's About Time," within its on-air branding, instead concentrating on establishing the station's association with CBS and restructuring the news department's focus towards more in-depth investigative reporting.

New Vision Television ownership
On April 6, 2006, NBC Universal announced that it would sell WVTM-TV and three of its other smaller-market owned-and-operated stations – WJAR-TV in Providence, Rhode Island, WCMH-TV in Columbus, Ohio, and WNCN in Raleigh, North Carolina – to Media General for $600 million. As the FCC media ownership regulations for television duopolies prohibit broadcasting companies from owning two of the four highest-rated television stations within the same media market, Media General subsequently announced that it would it seek a buyer for its existing station in the Birmingham–Tuscaloosa–Anniston market, WIAT, and acquire WVTM, which at the time was the higher rated of the two stations in terms of total day viewership.

The FCC subsequently granted the company a temporary waiver of its ownership rules that allowed it to keep both WVTM and WIAT for six months after the purchase of the former was completed; Media General's purchase of all four stations was finalized on June 26, 2006. On August 2, Media General announced that it had sold WIAT and fellow CBS affiliate KIMT in Mason City, Iowa to New Vision Television for $35 million; the sale was finalized on October 12, 2006.

The extensive changes that helped WIAT become a ratings force in the market in the latter years under Media General ownership continued as a New Vision-owned station. Under New Vision, channel 42 saw some of its largest ratings increases in the station's history. It is now one of the strongest CBS affiliates in the nation, after spending the better part of its history as one of the weakest. WIAT has particularly benefited from the network's broadcasts of college football games from the Southeastern Conference, which garner higher ratings on channel 42 than on any other station in the country. SEC game telecasts, particularly those involving the Alabama Crimson Tide and Auburn Tigers, are among the highest-rated programs in Birmingham during the NCAA Division I football season, typically delivering higher ratings in the market than network telecasts of the Super Bowl; this includes the Iron Bowl rivalry game between Alabama and Auburn, which – through CBS – has aired on WIAT for all but three years since 2000.

In the summer of 2009, the station upgraded its master control facilities to allow the transmission of pre-recorded syndicated programming in high definition, with some station promotions beginning to be broadcast in the format by September 2009.

LIN Media ownership
On May 7, 2012, LIN Media announced that it would purchase the New Vision Television stations, including WIAT, for $330.4 million, in a deal under which the company would also assume $12 million in New Vision's corporate debt. The FCC approved the sale on October 2, and the transaction was finalized ten days later on October 12; as a result, WIAT became a sister station to LIN's Mobile duopoly of Fox affiliate WALA-TV and CW affiliate WFNA, both of which had been purchased by LIN from Emmis Communications in 2006.

Second stint under Media General

On March 21, 2014, Media General announced that it had entered into an agreement to merge with LIN Media in a $1.6 billion deal. As a result, due in part to the same FCC duopoly restrictions based on total day viewership that prompted Media General to sell WIAT to New Vision eight years earlier, Media General was once again required to sell either WIAT or WVTM to another station owner in order to comply with FCC ownership rules. In this situation, the sales that Media General and LIN voluntarily chose to conduct in Birmingham and four other markets were also in response to the FCC's plan to restrict sharing agreements involving two or more television stations in the same market. On May 12, 2014, when it unveiled a new proprietary graphics and imaging package, WIAT dropped the "CBS 42" brand after eleven years in favor of a callsign-based branding as "WIAT 42"; the station would later combine the latter moniker with a restored "CBS 42" brand (as "WIAT CBS 42") in May 2015, initially in the form of verbal identification during newscasts and station promotions.

On August 20, 2014, Media General announced that it would reacquire WIAT and sell WVTM, along with ABC affiliate WJCL in Savannah, Georgia, to Hearst Television; the sale made WIAT a sister station to Mobile's CBS affiliate WKRG-TV (an existing Media General station which formed a new duopoly with WFNA after LIN chose to sell WALA-TV to the Meredith Corporation due to similar ownership conflicts as those involving WIAT and WVTM). Media General completed its merger with LIN on December 19, making WIAT a Media General property for the second time; Hearst closed on its purchase of WVTM and WJCL three days later on December 22.

Sale to Nexstar
On September 8, 2015, Media General announced that it would acquire the Des Moines, Iowa-based Meredith Corporation for $2.4 billion with the intention to name the combined group Meredith Media General once the sale was finalized.

However, on September 28, Irving, Texas-based Nexstar Broadcasting Group made an unsolicited cash-and-stock merger offer for Media General, originally valued at $14.50 per share. On November 16, following opposition to the merger with Meredith by minority shareholders Oppenheimer Holdings and Starboard Capital (primarily because Meredith's magazine properties were included in the deal, which would have re-entered Media General into publishing after it sold its newspapers to BH Media in 2012 to reduce debt) and the rejection of Nexstar's initial offer by company management, Media General agreed to enter into negotiations with Nexstar on a suitable counter deal, while the Meredith merger proposal remained active; the two eventually concluded negotiations on January 6, 2016, reaching a merger agreement for valued at $17.14 per share (an evaluation of $4.6 billion, plus the assumption of $2.3 billion in debt).

On January 27, Meredith formally broke off the proposed merger with Media General and accepted the termination fee of $60 million previously negotiated under the original merger proposal; Media General subsequently signed an agreement to be acquired by Nexstar (with the combined company to be known as Nexstar Media Group), in exchange for giving Meredith right of first refusal to acquire any broadcast or digital properties that may be divested. As of the completion of the sale on January 17, 2017, WIAT was under common ownership with two other Alabama stations that are already owned by Nexstar outright, dual Fox/MyNetworkTV affiliate WZDX in the adjacent Huntsville market (which Nexstar sold to Tegna in March 2019 to acquire CBS affiliate WHNT-TV through the company's purchase of Tribune Media) and ABC affiliate WDHN in Dothan.

Programming
WIAT carries the entire CBS programming schedule; however, it broadcasts the network's Saturday morning programming out of pattern, airing CBS Saturday Morning after the network's educational program block, CBS Dream Team; the station also airs the third hour of the Dream Team lineup on Sunday mornings on tape delay following the weekend edition of Wake Up Alabama.

Syndicated programming broadcast by WIAT includes Dr. Phil, Madam Secretary, Entertainment Tonight and Jeopardy!. Birmingham is one of the few U.S. markets to air Jeopardy! and its sister game show Wheel of Fortune on separate stations; Wheel airs on ABC affiliate WBMA-LD.

Sports programming
WIAT serves as the de facto flagship station of Alabama Crimson Tide athletics, due to CBS's broadcast rights to Southeastern Conference football and basketball games, and a deal between the station and the University of Alabama in which channel 42 serves as the primary broadcast partner for all team-related programming including the Tide coaches' show, The Nick Saban Football Show, the magazine program Tide TV This Week (most other Tide-related programs produced by the university's Tide TV production unit are broadcast in the market on university-owned This TV affiliate WVUA-CD [channel 7] and its satellite WVUA [channel 23] in Tuscaloosa); the station also produces locally produced Tide-related programs under the umbrella title Red Zone, consisting of a weekly analysis program on Friday and Saturday nights as well as pre-game and post-game shows during the college football season.

News operation

, WIAT presently broadcasts 31 hours of locally produced newscasts each week (with five hours each weekday and three hours each on Saturdays and Sundays).

News department history
As WBMG, channel 42's newscasts consistently languished at (an often distant) third place among the Birmingham market's television news operations. In addition to its aforementioned reception problems, the news department had a reputation for being short of professional standards. According to local legends, the station's newscasts often – inadvertently or not – became comedy shows. Examples of this include Tommy Charles (a local radio personality formerly with WSGN and WAQY, who served as a sports anchor for WBMG during the mid-1970s) wadding up scripts and tossing them over his shoulder during the sports segment after he read them, as well as even letting deflating balloons fly around the set for no apparent reason.

Under Park Communications ownership, the station made concerted moves to professionalize its newscasts; under general manager Hugh Smith, it hired Thom Gossom as lead anchor, and acquired the first color remote vehicle in Birmingham (which incorporated equipment originally purchased in 1972 for its broadcasts of Dawson Memorial Baptist Church's weekly services). These efforts led to little success in increasing its ratings, leading WBMG to discontinue long-form local news programming in 1980. For the next seven years, it aired syndicated shows at both 5:00 and 10:00 p.m. The only news programming that aired on channel 42 during this time consisted of hourly cut-ins during regular programming. WBMG re-established a full-fledged news department in 1987, but its newscasts barely registered much higher than hashmarks (less than one ratings share point) in the ratings.

The station managed to make a name for itself while John Harrod served as its news director from 1990 to 1995. Harrod built a very aggressive and hard-hitting news department concentrating exclusively on local stories and investigative reporting.  It also gradually expanded its news programming, adding two additional newscasts at 6:00 a.m. and 6:00 p.m. on weekdays by 1995. The station won a number of awards from the Associated Press for its reporting during Harrod's tenure. Indeed, when ABC began putting out feelers for a new affiliate in Birmingham, it seriously considered buying WBMG outright due to the performance of its news department.

However, critical acclaim was not rewarded with a ratings win. Despite making a more credible effort than before, WBMG's newscasts barely registered as a blip in the ratings, lagging well behind WBRC and WVTM.  It even fell to fourth shortly after the WBMA trimulcast launched its news department after it took over the ABC affiliation from WBRC when that station switched to Fox in September 1996. At one point in 1997, the station's news programming scored less than a 1% ratings share, with its 10:00 p.m. newscast scoring lower ratings than reruns of Sanford and Son on WABM.

A few months after Media General took over the station following its merger with Park Communications, newly appointed general manager Eric Land decided to completely reboot the news department. On December 12, 1997, Land announced to station employees that the bulk of channel 42's news staff, totaling 21 employees (eight anchors and thirteen other on-air and production staff members, including all of the station's on-air reporters and several producers and editors), would be laid off. The late newscast on December 31 would be its last newscast as WBMG. On January 1, 1998, Land temporarily suspended the news department, cancelling the station's morning and evening newscasts. All of the remaining members of channel 42's news staff were fired, with the exception of weekend sports anchor Sam Smith. Over the next month, channel 42 rebuilt its news department from scratch with input from focus groups and market research. During that time, the station began filling the 6:00 a.m. and 6:00 p.m. time slots respectively with religious and syndicated programming; meanwhile, it also showed a much-talked-about slide of a computer-animated digital countdown clock during the 5:00 and 10:00 p.m. half-hours, where newscasts would air once the department was relaunched. During this time, the station sent coverage of the January 29 bombing of the New Woman All Women Clinic in Birmingham's Southside neighborhood by Eric Rudolph to CBS Newspath, CNN, and stations in neighboring markets, even though it did not have a formal news department at the time.

The new format debuted on February 5, 1998 – coinciding with CBS's broadcast of the opening ceremonies of the Winter Olympics – under the title 42 Daily News. Land had overseen less drastic relaunches during earlier stints at WEYI-TV in Saginaw, Michigan and WGRZ-TV in Buffalo, New York.  However, in an interview with the American Journalism Review, Land later said that the decision to overhaul the news department in such a dramatic manner was because, even with its Associated Press award wins earlier in the decade, the station's research "found that our people were so closely identified with a poorly performing product that we had to create a new brand and start over again." Television news analyst Don Fitzpatrick called the drastic changes an "extremely rare [...] act of desperation". The timing of the relaunch was chosen for a reason; partly due to the merger of WCFT, WJSU and WBMA-LP into Birmingham's ABC affiliate two years earlier, Nielsen collapsed the previously separate Tuscaloosa and Anniston-Gadsden markets back into the Birmingham market. The move, which took effect in September 1998, resulted in the newly re-enlarged market jumping twelve spots on Nielsen's annual media market rankings at one stroke (from 51st to 39th place). At the same time, Nielsen converted Birmingham to a metered market in the fall of 1998 for ratings purposes.

The rebooted newscasts initially did not employ any on-air reporters.  Instead, in a style similar to the modern-day multimedia journalist concept, the station used crews of photographers with either reporters or field producers, and one-man bands, to produce and edit stories, in an approach that emphasized content over personalities. All stories were narrated by the anchors, echoing the manner in which most television stations provided reports during their newscasts well into the 1960s. Designed as "news for busy people," the station imposed strict time limits on story packages, with all segments structured in the form of "news minutes" (such as "Top Story in a Minute," "Weather Minute," "Neighborhood Minute" and a "2-Minute Drill" sportscast) in order to be able to incorporate a broad array of local, national and international stories and feature segments within each half-hour newscast. One anchor manned the news desk, while the other read stories from various places on the new set. Al Primo, who created the "Eyewitness News" format at KYW-TV in Philadelphia back in 1965, delivered sharp criticism of what he felt was "a product that was generated solely by research and implemented by people who don't know anything about the news business" and "the most disjointed presentation [of a newscast] that I have ever seen in my life". Land responded to Primo's scathing remarks by comparing the format to the Al Schottelkotte News, a longtime staple of WCPO-TV in Cincinnati from the 1960s until 1990, for which he had been a reporter: "[The Al Schottelkotte News] was very nontraditional, but jam-packed with information."

The new anchor team was mostly made up of talent who had not previously worked in the Birmingham market. Original co-anchor Keith Cate – who co-anchored the weeknight newscasts with Sherri Jackson, who herself remains with WIAT  – had previously been a main anchor at WMAR-TV in Baltimore; his reaction to the fast-paced news style was, according to him, "This looks like 'Headline News' gone local." The only on-air talent with longstanding roots in Birmingham was the two-person sports team of sports director Paul Finebaum and weekend sports anchor Sam Smith. Finebaum's established popularity from his highly opinionated column in the Birmingham Post-Herald and radio show on WERC (960 AM) sparked some interest from sports fans. However, his sportscasts were often seen as incomplete since he had only two minutes to convey the day's sports headlines and scores. Smith, the only holdover from the old WBMG, left the station after only a few months under the revamped news department.

Even with the time constraints, WIAT was seen as making a more credible effort at news than ever before. Ratings for its newscasts increased immediately (the 10:00 p.m. newscast, in particular, had increased from a paltry 1/3 share in February 1997 to a 7 share in February 1998, partly due to having the Winter Olympics as a lead-in) but were still not enough to overtake the competition. Ratings also increased once Birmingham became a metered market, moving to 3 and 4 shares on most nights early in the fall of 1998. At that time, fellow CBS affiliate WNAL-TV in Gadsden – which did not create a news department of its own when it joined the network in September 1996 – entered into an agreement to air simulcasts of WBMG's newscasts, which aired on WNAL until it became an independent station in January 1999. Media General would later expand the Daily News format to fellow CBS affiliate WHLT in Hattiesburg, Mississippi.

That same year, the station notched its first three Emmy Award nominations in its history, winning two; Keith Cate won "Best News Anchor", and the news department as a whole won for "Best Live Reporting". However, the station became embroiled in behind-the-scenes disputes with management and former on-air talent that were let go after Media General took over and Land decided to relaunch the news department; this led to a number of breach of contract, fraud and defamation of character and racial discrimination lawsuits against the station and/or Media General by former on-air and production employees, including former sports anchor Doug Bell and former longtime general manager Hoyle Broome (Land's direct predecessor, who had been with the then-WBMG since 1977), as well as a group of former African-American employees (calling themselves the Birmingham Seven). Over the next few years, more newscasts would be added to WIAT's schedule: the station debuted a half-hour newscast at 6:00 p.m. on Monday through Saturday evenings in September 2001, followed by the addition of a two-hour weekday morning newscast in September 2004.

Bill Ballard, who succeeded Land as general manager in 2003, brought in Larry Ragan, a seasoned news director who quickly hired WVTM veteran Ken Lass and WBMA meteorologist Mark Prater (formerly the understudy of veteran Birmingham meteorologist James Spann). The station subsequently rebranded its newscasts as News 42, began hiring assignment reporters to present and narrate stories, and gradually eased its limits on story lengths. The ratings for WIAT's newscasts continued to steadily improve over the next several years, allowing it to become more competitive than ever before. Since the early 2000s, WIAT has had a spirited three-way battle with WVTM and WBMA for second place behind long-dominant WBRC, and since 2006, its late-evening newscasts has consistently finished in second place in the 10:00 p.m. time slot. On some occasions, it has even surged all the way to first place—among the few times in the last half-century that WBRC has lost any timeslot. In recent years, WIAT has won many regional and national journalism awards for its reporting; in 2007 and 2008, WIAT won more Alabama Broadcasters Association Awards than any other station, as well as numerous Associated Press Awards. WIAT was awarded the "Alabama Television Station of the Year" award by the Alabama Broadcasters Association in 2010 and 2012, and is the only Alabama television station to have won the award twice. In 2012, the station won 19 awards, more than in any other year in its history, including nine regional Edward R. Murrow Awards (including for "Overall Excellence;" "Best Newscast;" and "Best Breaking News Coverage" and "Best Continuing Coverage" for its coverage of the 2011 Super Outbreak), more than any other station in the country.

In October 2005, WIAT assumed production responsibilities of WB affiliate WTTO's half-hour 9:00 p.m. newscast, the WB 21 News at Nine, through a news share agreement; the nightly program was produced out of WIAT's main news set and utilized its evening anchors as well as a modified graphics package. Unable to make ratings headway against WBRC's longer-established – and much higher-rated – prime time newscast (which debuted in September 1996 upon its switch to Fox), WTTO terminated the agreement, with the WIAT-produced newscast ending on October 13, 2006, nearly one month after channel 21 became a CW affiliate. On April 9, 2010, WIAT became the third television station in the Birmingham–Tuscaloosa–Anniston market (after WVTM and WBRC) to begin broadcasting its local newscasts in high definition. On April 25, 2015, WIAT debuted a two-hour weekend edition of its morning newscast, Wake Up Alabama, on Saturdays and Sundays from 5:00 to 7:00 a.m. This was followed exactly one year later on April 25, 2016, by the addition of a half-hour newscast at noon, which marked the first time that WIAT had produced a midday news program.

Currently, the evening news is anchored by Sherri Jackson and Art Franklin.  Franklin was an anchor at WBRC in the 1990s and early 2000s.

On September 14, 2020, WIAT added a 4:00 p.m. newscast.

Notable former on-air staff
 Doug Bell – weeknight sports anchor (1987–1997; now a freelance sports journalist)
 Dale Cardwell – investigative reporter (1984–1987)
 Keith Cate – weekday evening news anchor (1998–2000; now at WFLA-TV in Tampa)
 Alex Chappell – sports reporter (now with Mid-Atlantic Sports Network)
 Hank Erwin – anchor (late 1970s–early 1980s); later became a news reporter on WYDE; former member of the Alabama State Legislature
 Paul Finebaum – sports director (1998–2001; currently a sports commentator for SEC Network)

Technical information

Subchannels
The station's digital signal is multiplexed:

In 2007, WIAT launched a second digital subchannel on virtual channel 42.2, carrying a locally produced weather information format. In late March 2009, the subchannel became an affiliate of Untamed Sports TV; the station promotes digital channel 42.2 as a separate channel on-air and on the station's website. In addition to Untamed Sports programming, the 42.2 subchannel also carries live and tape-delayed local high school sports events and a video simulcast of the syndicated radio program Rick and Bubba. At that time, the station launched an additional subchannel on virtual channel 42.3, which took over carriage of its 24-hour weather channel.

On November 1, 2017, WIAT added a fourth subchannel affiliated with Laff. Untamed Sports TV was replaced with Escape (now Ion Mystery), which, along with Laff, continued to be carried on WUOA-LD (channel 46) under an existing subchannel leasing agreement until both were dropped by the low-power station in 2019.

Analog-to-digital conversion
WIAT shut down its analog signal, over UHF channel 42, on June 12, 2009, the official date in which full-power television stations in the United States transitioned from analog to digital broadcasts under federal mandate. The station's digital signal remained on its pre-transition UHF channel 30. Through the use of PSIP, digital television receivers display the station's virtual channel as its former UHF analog channel 42.

On April 5, 2010, the FCC granted WIAT a construction permit for a digital fill-in translator on its former UHF analog channel 42 to serve the Tuscaloosa area, which would maintain transmitter facilities on the tower previously used by WDBB (channel 17) near Jug Factory Road.

Transmitter
The WIAT-TV Tower is a  guyed mast, located at 30°41'17.0" N and 87°47'54.0" W. The WIAT-TV Tower was built in 1974.
 http://www.skyscraperpage.com/diagrams/?b17269

References

External links
 
 Birmingham Rewound – classic TV

IAT
CBS network affiliates
Ion Mystery affiliates
True Crime Network affiliates
Court TV affiliates
Television channels and stations established in 1965
1965 establishments in Alabama
Nexstar Media Group